BP Boötis is a solitary variable star in the northern constellation of Boötes, near the northern constellation border with Draco. It is visible to the naked eye as a dim, white-hued star with an apparent visual magnitude that fluctuates around 5.48. The star is located 299 light years away from the Sun based on parallax, but is drifting closer with a radial velocity of −16 km/s.

It is an Alpha2 Canum Venaticorum variable that varies in brightness by 0.02 magnitude over a period of 1.3 days. The distribution of silicon across the surface appears to be associated with the magnetic field of the star, with depleted regions appearing around the magnetic poles.

BP Boötis is 170 million years old with a projected rotational velocity of 69 km/s, having a rotation period of 1.29557 days. It has 2.6 times the mass of the Sun and 2.7 times the Sun's radius. The star is radiating 65 times the luminosity of the Sun from its photosphere at an effective temperature of 9,954 K.

References

A-type main-sequence stars
Alpha2 Canum Venaticorum variables
Ap stars

Boötes
Durchmusterung objects
140728
076957
5857
Bootis, BX